Sober Grid is a digital health company providing mental health addiction care around the world in over 170 countries.

The mobile user base is largest social mobile networking application for people with substance abuse issues on a mobile platform. The application works by connecting sober people and those looking to get sober based on their relative distance. Sober Grid creator Beau Man had the idea to create Sober Grid while attending the Sundance Film Festival. He serves as President and CEO.

With millions worldwide struggling with addiction, the creators saw that there was a need for developing a community. Sober Grid's goal is sharing a tool that makes peer support available at the touch of a button.

In June 2018 Sober Grid purchased Ascent, an evidence-based peer recovery coaching service in Ohio. Through this acquisition, Sober Grid is now able to provide HIPAA compliant 24/7 certified peer coaching support through their application.

The company received funding from the National Science Foundation and the National Institutes of Health. The company is partnered with researchers from the University of Pennsylvania Perelman School of Medicine and Harvard Medical School where it works on its Artificial Intelligence capabilities to predict relapses and hopefully later intervene. The company has appeared on Fox, CNBC, Entrepreneur, NY Metro, New York Times, The Boston Globe, Forbes, and many other media outlets.

Features
The design of Sober Grid has two main features: the newsfeed and the grid. The newsfeed contains a time-oriented list of posts from Sober Grid users. The grid displays users based on their proximity.  On the newsfeed, users have the option to turn on the “burning desire” feature.

Competitors
Sober Grid is a leader in the digital health marketplace for mental health and Substance Use Disorder. Sober Grid competes with a rival digital health therapy, reSET-O, made for Opioid Use Disorder by Pear Therapeutics. Click Therapeutics and MAP Health Management  are also competitors to Sober Grid.

An additional feature, added in September 2018 allows users to pay for certified peer coaching.

References 

Geosocial networking